Lhamoyzingkhar is a border town in south-western Bhutan. It is located in Sarpang District.

At the 2005 census its population was 778.

References

Populated places in Bhutan